Six Battery Road, formerly the Standard Chartered Bank Building, is a high-rise skyscraper located in the central business district of Singapore. It is located at 6 Battery Road, in Raffles Place. The tower is situated adjacent to the Bank of China Building and faces the Singapore River. It is a class-A office building and houses the offices of several multi-national companies. The development had a net floor area of 46,060 m2,as of 30 June 2007, and has direct access to Raffles Place MRT station.

At its completion, it was the largest building for the Standard Chartered Bank worldwide and also represented the largest single investment by a British company. The building is on a 999-year leasehold.

History 
Six Battery Road was designed by P & T Architects & Engineers Ltd and RSP Architects Planners & Engineers Private Limited, and was completed in 1984. Other firms involved in the development included CapitaLand Commercial Limited, Clover Properties Private Limited, Hazama Gumi, CapitaLand Limited, Lighting Design Partnership, Meinhardt (Singapore) Private Limited, and Sidley Austin Brown & Wood LLP.

The building was officially opened on 24 October 1984 by Lord Barber, then chairman of the Standard Chartered Bank Group as the anchor tenant. The building's 1st, 20th, 21st, 43rd, and 44th floors underwent a renovation, which was completed in March 2002.

Architecture 
Six Battery Road has a baltic brown granite exterior and is mainly made out of concrete. Despite the building being a British investment, it was feng-shui (Chinese geomancy) tested. Even the opening date was chosen as it was a propitious day according to the Chinese Almanac.

See also 
 List of tallest buildings in Singapore
 Raffles Place

References

External links 

1984 establishments in Singapore
CapitaLand
Downtown Core (Singapore)
Office buildings completed in 1984
Skyscraper office buildings in Singapore
Raffles Place
Standard Chartered
20th-century architecture in Singapore